Euclid, Euclides, or Eucleides generally refers to the ancient Greek mathematician Euclid of Alexandria (3rd century BC), who wrote a work on geometry called the Elements.

It may also refer to:

People
 Euclid of Megara (c. 435 BC–c. 365 BC), ancient Greek philosopher
 Eucleides, archon of Athens (5th century BC)
 Euclid Bertrand (born 1974), Dominican former footballer
 Euclides da Cunha (1866–1909), Brazilian sociologist
 Euclid Kyurdzidis (born 1968), Russian actor
 Euclid Tsakalotos (born 1960), Greek economist and Minister of Finance
 Nicholas Euclid (1932–2007), Australian rugby league player, coach, and official

Mathematics, science, and technology
 Euclid Contest, a maths competition held by the Centre for Education in Mathematics and Computing
 Euclid (programming language)
 Euclid (computer program)
 Euclid, a computer system used by Euroclear
 Euclid (spacecraft), a space telescope built by ESA, to be launched in 2023
 Euclidean space
 4354 Euclides

Higher education
 EUCLID (university), an intergovernmental organization
 Euclid Consortium, a group of universities
 Project Euclid, a university collaboration to assist publishing in math and statistics

Places in the United States
 Euclid, Minnesota, an unincorporated community
 Euclid Township, Polk County, Minnesota
 Euclid, Ohio, a city and suburb of Cleveland
 Euclid Township, Cuyahoga County, Ohio, in existence from 1809 to 1917
 Euclid, Pennsylvania, an unincorporated community
 Euclid, West Virginia, an unincorporated community

Fiction
 Euclid, a supercomputer built by the fictional character Maximillian Cohen in the 1998 film Pi
 Euclid, a town in the game Tales of Phantasia
 Euclid, an object classification in the SCP Foundation storytelling project

Other uses
 Euclid Avenue (disambiguation), several streets in the United States, as well as transit stations and a school
 Euclid Apartments, listed on the National Register of Historic Places in Washington, D.C.
 Euclid Tree, a giant Sequoia in California
 Euclid Trucks, a company specialized in heavy equipment for earthmoving
 Village of Euclid, Ohio v. Ambler Realty Co., a U.S. Supreme Court case relevant to contemporary land use and police power issues; the legal precedent for zoning